The Drag Net, also known as The Dragnet, is a 1928 American silent crime drama produced by Famous Players-Lasky and  distributed by Paramount Pictures based on the story "Nightstick" by Oliver H.P. Garrett. It was directed by Josef von Sternberg from an original screen story and starring George Bancroft and Evelyn Brent.

This feature is now considered a lost film.

Plot
Film historian John Baxter provides a synopsis of it, a film "no longer known to exist in any archive":

Cast
George Bancroft as "Two-Gun" Nolan
Evelyn Brent as "The Magpie"
William Powell as "Dapper" Frank Trent
Fred Kohler as 'Gabby' Steve
Francis McDonald as "Sniper" Dawson
Leslie Fenton as "Shakespeare"

Reception

On June 4, 1928, The New York Times panned the film: "Notwithstanding George Bancroft's derisive laugh, Evelyn Brent's striking plumed headgear and Josef von Sternberg's generous display of slaughter, The Drag Net is an emphatically mediocre effort."

Critic John Baxter lists The Drag Net among a number of [Sternberg's] films which "failed commercially."

Critical response

Critic Andrew Sarris concedes that "the plot does sound extremely contrived" but cautions that "plots...are no clue to the merits of Sternberg's films, and until his long-missing film materializes, we must suspend judgment on a work that bridges The Last Command and The Docks of New York."

John Baxter considers The Drag Net to be "in most respects a sequel [to Sternberg's film] Underworld, [and] is perhaps not too great a loss, though it is unwise to write off any Sternberg film."

References

Sources
Baxter, John. 1971. The Cinema of Josef von Sternberg. The International Film Guide Series. A.S Barners & Company, New York.
Sarris, Andrew. 1966. The Films of Josef von Sternberg. Museum of Modern Art/Doubleday. New York, New York.
Sarris, Andrew. 1998. "You Ain't Heard Nothin' Yet." The American Talking Film History & Memory, 1927–1949. Oxford University Press.

External links

lobby card The Drag Net

1928 films
American crime drama films
American black-and-white films
American silent feature films
Famous Players-Lasky films
Films directed by Josef von Sternberg
Lost American films
American gangster films
1928 crime drama films
Films with screenplays by Herman J. Mankiewicz
Films with screenplays by Jules Furthman
1920s police films
1928 lost films
1920s American films
Silent American drama films